Rancho Alegre may refer to:

 Rancho Alegre, Texas, census-designated place in Jim Wells County, Texas
 Rancho Alegre, Paraná, Brazilian municipality
 Rancho Alegre d'Oeste, municipality in Paraná, Brazil
 Rancho Alegre, Bolivia
 Rancho Alegre Airport, in Bolivia
 Rancho Alegre, a Boy Scouts camp in the Los Padres Council area
 Rancho Alegre (film) 1941 film with Miguel Aceves Mejía